Highlander may refer to:

Regional cultures
 Gorals (lit. Highlanders), a culture in southern Poland and northern Slovakia
 Hill people, who live in hills and mountains
 Merina people, an ethnic group from the central plateau of Madagascar
 Montagnard (Vietnam), various ethnic groups in the highlands of Vietnam
 Pahari people (disambiguation), various ethnic groups from the Himalayas
 Malësor or Malok (lit. Highlanders), a person from Malësia (highlands) in Albania
 a person from the Ethiopian Highlands
 a person from the Scottish Highlands
 Montañés (lit. Highlanders), the people of Cantabria in northern Spain
 Southern Highlanders, the mountain people of Southern Appalachia in the eastern United States

Publications
 The Highlander, a book written by James Macpherson
 The Highlander (newspaper), a Gaelic-language political newspaper based in Scotland
 The Highlander, the student newspaper of the University of California, Riverside
 The Highlander, the student newspaper of David Douglas High School, Portland, Oregon

Entertainment

Highlander franchise
 Highlander (franchise), a franchise of films, television series and other media
 Highlander (comics)
 Highlander books

Films
 Highlander (film), 1986
 Highlander II: The Quickening, 1991
 Highlander III: The Sorcerer (Highlander III: The Final Dimension), 1994
 Highlander: Endgame, 2000
 Highlander: The Source, 2007
 Highlander: The Search for Vengeance, a 2007 spin-off animated film

Television series
 Highlander: The Series (1992-1998)
 Highlander: The Raven (1998-1999)
 Highlander: The Animated Series

Games
 Highlander (video game), a 1986 one-on-one sword fighting ZX Spectrum and Commodore 64 game
 Highlander: The Last of the MacLeods, a 1995 video game for the Atari Jaguar CD
 Highlander: The Card Game, a collectible card game originally produced by Thunder Castle Games, reintroduced by Le Montagnard Inc
 Highlander: The Game, a canceled video game based on the Highlander franchise

Other entertainment
 Highlander, a competitive format of Team Fortress 2
 Highlander (Bakufu Slump album)

Military
 Highland regiments
 :Category:Highland regiments, a list of regiments formed of or following Highlander Regiments tradition
 Highlanders, nickname of the 1st Light Armored Reconnaissance Battalion, a light armored U.S. Marine Corps Battalion based out of MCB Camp Pendleton, California
 HMS Highlander (H44), a Royal Navy H-Class Destroyer that served in World War II

Sports 
 The Highlander, a former Mountain marathon in Scotland

Teams and school nicknames

Professional
 Highlanders (rugby union), a rugby union team based in Dunedin, New Zealand
 The Highlanders (professional wrestling), a tag team in World Wrestling Entertainment (WWE)
 Highlanders F.C., a Zimbabwean football (soccer) club
 Highland Football League one of three senior non-league football (soccer), leagues in Scotland
 Cape Breton Highlanders, a NBL Canada team
 Mbabane Highlanders F.C., a Swazi football (soccer) club
 The Highlanders, a Scottish cricket franchise in the North Sea Pro Series
 The New York Highlanders, a baseball team which would later become the New York Yankees

College
 Cairn University Highlanders, Langhorne, Pennsylvania
 NJIT Highlanders, New Jersey Institute of Technology
 Radford Highlanders, Radford University, in southwest Virginia, US
 University of California, Riverside Highlanders
 Houghton College Highlanders, Houghton, New York

High school, preparatory and other secondary schools
 Doherty Memorial High School, Worcester, Massachusetts
 Glenvar High School, Roanoke County, Virginia
 Heathwood Hall Episcopal School, Columbia, South Carolina
 Herricks High School, Searingtown, New York
 Homestead High School (Mequon, Wisconsin)
 Howell High School (Howell, Michigan) 
 Lake Highland Preparatory School, Orlando, Florida
 MacArthur High School (Lawton, Oklahoma)
 McLean High School, McLean, Virginia
 Northern Highlands Regional High School, Allendale, Bergen County, New Jersey
 Northwestern Regional High School, Winsted, Connecticut
 Oak Hills High School, Bridgetown, Ohio
 Rochester Adams High School, Rochester Hills, Michigan
 The Woodlands High School, The Woodlands, Texas
 Thomas McKean High School, Wilmington, Delaware
 West Morris Central High School, Washington Township, Morris County, New Jersey
 Royal High School, Simi Valley, California

Vehicles
 H1ghlander, an autonomous vehicle created by Carnegie Mellon University's Red Team for the DARPA Grand Challenge
 Highlander (dinghy), a dinghy class sailboat manufactured by Allen Boat Company
 AirLony Highlander, a Czech ultralight biplane
 Toyota Highlander, a sport utility vehicle
 MV Highlanders, Canadian ferry
 Royal Highlander, a former passenger train traveling between London and Inverness, Scotland

Other uses
 Alain Baxter (born 1973), Scottish alpine skier nicknamed "the Highlander"
 Highlander cat, a hybrid domestic cat
 Highlander Research and Education Center, New Market, Tennessee
 a statue on the monument at Glenfinnan, Scotland
 a statue on the 51st (Highland) Division Monument (Beaumont-Hamel), France
 Highlander (Hansa-Park), gyro drop tower at Hansa-Park

See also
Highland (disambiguation)